NGC 6085 is a spiral galaxy in the constellation of Corona Borealis. It is classified as a LINER galaxy and is a member of Abell 2162.

References

External links
 

Abell 2162
Corona Borealis
Spiral galaxies
6085
10269
57486
LINER galaxies